The Hundred Flower Pond ( also  or ) is a small artificial lake in the historical center of the City of Jinan, Shandong Province, China. It is located east of the northern end of Qushuiting Street and south of Daming Lake Road.

See also
List of sites in Jinan

Bodies of water of Shandong
Lakes of China